Monad University is a state private university located in NCR region, Hapur, Uttar Pradesh.  It was established by UP State Govt. Act 23 of 2010 & U/S 2 (f) of 1956.University offers various courses in field of engineering, sciences, Education, pharmacy, law etc.

Schools
School of Engineering &Technology
School of Law
School of Pharmacy
School of Architecture & Planning
School of Education
School of Management and Business Studies
School of Sciences and Agriculture
School of Humanities & Social Sciences
Monad College of Pharmacy

References

External links

Private universities in Uttar Pradesh
Educational institutions established in 2010
2010 establishments in Uttar Pradesh
Hapur